Armix is a commune in the Ain department in the Auvergne-Rhône-Alpes region of eastern France.

Geography
Armix is located some 30 km south-east of Amberieu-en-Bugey and 40 km north-west of Aix-les-Bains.  It can be accessed by road D103 from Rossillon in the south passing through the village and continuing north to Premillieu. There are few small mountain roads in the commune which is entirely mountainous and mostly forested.

The Ruisseau Pointay rises near the village and flows south joining the Ruisseau de la Chana which forms part of the southern border and continues south-west to join the Furans river.

Administration

List of mayors of Armix

Economy
The Economy of the commune of Armix is mostly Agriculture. The commune of Armix is located in the Rhone-Alpes, region in the department of Ain. The economy of the Rhone-Alpes region is based on raw materials, agriculture and energy.

Population

Armix Photo Gallery

See also
Communes of the Ain department

References

External links
Armix on the old IGN website 
Armix on the 1750 Cassini Map

Communes of Ain